Tehri Visthapit is a village in Rishikesh, India. In 2002, the village's people were evacuated during the making of the Tehri Dam.

Villages in Dehradun district